Nathalie Élimas (born 5 June 1973) is a French politician of the Democratic Movement (MoDem) who served as State Secretary for Priority Education at the Ministry of National Education in the government of Prime Minister Jean Castex from 2020 to 2022. She was previously a member of the National Assembly from 2017 until 2020, representing Val-d'Oise's 6th constituency.

Political career
Élimas first became involved in politics during the 2007 French presidential election, during which she supported MoDem candidate François Bayrou. 

In the 2015 French regional elections, Élimas was elected to the Regional Council of Île-de-France, as part of the electoral list led by Valérie Pécresse.  

In parliament, Élimas served on the Committee on Social Affairs from 2017 until 2020. 

On July 26, 2020, Élimas was appointed Secretary of State for Priority Education to the Minister of National Education, Youth and Sports Jean-Michel Blanquer. She left the government on 5 March 2022 following an administrative enquiry, after being accused of moral harassment by employees in her cabinet. She returned to Parliament.

She stood in the 2022 French legislative election as a miscellaneous centre candidate but lost her seat in the first round.

Political positions
In July 2019, Élimas voted in favor of the French ratification of the European Union’s Comprehensive Economic and Trade Agreement (CETA) with Canada.

References

1973 births
Living people
People from Beauvais
Deputies of the 15th National Assembly of the French Fifth Republic
Women members of the National Assembly (France)
Democratic Movement (France) politicians
21st-century French women politicians
Politicians from Île-de-France
Secretaries of State of France
Paris Nanterre University alumni